Florin Flavius Purece (born 6 November 1991) is a Romanian professional footballer who plays as a midfielder for Polish club Bruk-Bet Termalica Nieciecza.

Career

In 2012, he was sent on loan to Concordia Chiajna.

Career statistics

Club

Honours

Club
Viitorul Constanța
Liga I: 2016–17
Supercupa României runner-up: 2017

References

External links
 
 

1991 births
Living people
Romanian footballers
Romanian expatriate footballers
Romania youth international footballers
Association football midfielders
FC UTA Arad players
CS Concordia Chiajna players
FC Viitorul Constanța players
Hapoel Ra'anana A.F.C. players
Bruk-Bet Termalica Nieciecza players
Sepsi OSK Sfântu Gheorghe players
FCV Farul Constanța players
Liga I players
Liga II players
Israeli Premier League players
Ekstraklasa players
I liga players
Romanian expatriate sportspeople in England
Romanian expatriate sportspeople in Israel
Romanian expatriate sportspeople in Poland
Expatriate footballers in England
Expatriate footballers in Israel
Expatriate footballers in Poland
Sportspeople from Arad, Romania